St James' Church is in Mill Lane, West Derby, a suburb of Liverpool, Merseyside, England.  It was an active Anglican parish church in the deanery of West Derby, the archdeaconry of Liverpool, and the diocese of Liverpool until 23 June 2019 when responsibility was handed over to the Indian Orthodox Church.  Its benefice is united with that of St Mary, West Derby.  The church is designated by English Heritage as a Grade II listed building.

History

The church was designed by Edward Welch and built in 1845–46.  The original short chancel was replaced by a larger one by W. and J. Hay in 1875–76, and at the same time a south organ chamber, a north vestry, and a semicircular structure to the south of the tower, providing a staircase to the tower and new steps to the gallery, were added.  Originally the church has a slim broach spire, but this became unsafe, and was demolished and replaced by a low pyramidal roof in 1970.  In 1994 the interior of the church was re-ordered, the pews were removed, and a wall was inserted to form a parish hall at the rear.

Architecture

Exterior
St James' is orientated north–south; in the following description ritual orientation is used.  The church is built in red sandstone.  Its plan consists of a five-bay nave, north and south transepts, a chancel with a north chapel and a south vestry, and a west tower with a baptistry to the south.  The tower is in three stages, with a west doorway, lancet windows, louvred bell openings, and a pyramidal roof.  There are more lancet windows along the sides of the church, and a five lancets at the east end.  In the roof are dormers.

Interior
Inside the church the former west gallery is now in the parish hall.  Most of the stained glass was designed by Carl Almquist, E. H. Jewitt and W. J. Tipping, all of the Lancaster firm Shrigley and Hunt, with the glass in the lancet windows at the east end, dated 1876, by William Wailes.  The three-manual pipe organ was built in 1869–70 by William Hill and Son.  Originally in the west gallery, it was moved to the chancel in 1876, and it was rebuilt and enlarged, again by William Hill, in 1895.  There is a  ring of six bells, all cast in 1859 by George Mears at the Whitechapel Bell Foundry.

See also

Grade II listed buildings in Liverpool-L12

References

Churches in Liverpool
Grade II listed buildings in Liverpool
Grade II listed churches in Merseyside
Anglican Diocese of Liverpool
Church of England church buildings in Merseyside
Gothic Revival church buildings in England
Gothic Revival architecture in Merseyside
19th-century Church of England church buildings
Churches completed in 1876